Joseph Michael Dwyer (March 27, 1903 – October 21, 1992) was a pinch hitter in Major League Baseball. He played for the Cincinnati Reds.

References

External links

 

1903 births
1992 deaths
Baseball players from New Jersey
Binghamton Triplets players
Cincinnati Reds players
Jersey City Giants players
Little Rock Travelers players
Lowell Highwaymen players
Lynn Papooses players
Manchester Blue Sox players
Nashville Vols players
Newark Bears players
People from Orange, New Jersey
Rochester Tribe players
Salem Witches players
Scranton Miners players
Shreveport Sports players
Sportspeople from Essex County, New Jersey
Toledo Mud Hens players
Wilkes-Barre Barons players